Debbie Haski-Leventhal is an author and public speaker and professor of Management at Macquarie Business School, Macquarie University. She is a scholar of corporate social responsibility (CSR), responsible management education (RME) and volunteerism and is the editor-in-chief of Society and Business Review (Emerald Publishing).

Early life and career
Debbie Haski-Leventhal was born in Tel-Aviv. She grew up in an ultra-orthodox Jewish family but became secular at the age of 19. She then moved to Jerusalem to study philosophy at the Hebrew University where she also studied a Master’s in Management of not-for-profits and a PhD. She migrated to Sydney, Australia in 2008, worked at the Centre for Social Impact and in 2011 moved to Macquarie University.

Research work
Haski-Leventhal has published over 60 academic papers on CSR, RME, volunteering and social entrepreneurship in Human Relations, Journal of Business Ethics, MIT Sloan Management Review, NVSQ and other journals. Her work was covered many times by the media, including the New York Times and Financial Review. She is a TED speaker.

Publications

Books 
 Haski-Leventhal, D. (2020). The Purpose Driven University. London: Emerald Publishing.
 Haski-Leventhal, D., Roza, L., & Brammer, S. (2020). CSR and Employee Engagement. Edited book. London: SAGE Publications.
 Haski-Leventhal, D. (2018).  Strategic corporate social responsibility: tools & theories for responsible management. London:  SAGE Publications.

Most-cited publications 
 Haski-Leventhal, D., & Bargal, D. (2008).  The volunteer stages and transitions model: organizational socialization of volunteers.   Human Relations, 61 (1), 67-102. (Cited 396 times, according to Google Scholar  ) 
Handy F, Cnaan RA, Hustinx L, Kang C, Brudney JL, Haski-Leventhal D, Holmes K, Meijs LC, Pessi AB, Ranade B, Yamauchi N. A cross-cultural examination of student volunteering: Is it all about résumé building?. Nonprofit and Voluntary Sector Quarterly. 2010 Jun;39(3):498-523. (Cited 383 times, according to Google Scholar.)  
 Haski-Leventhal, D. (2009).  Altruism and volunteerism: The perceptions of altruism in four disciplines and their impact on the study of volunteerism.   Journal for the Theory of Social Behaviour, 39 (3), 271-299. (Cited 333 times, according to Google Scholar.)  
 Haski-Leventhal, D., Meijs, L., & Hustinx, L. (2010).  The third-party model: Enhancing volunteering through governments, corporations and educational institutes.   Journal of Social Policy, 39 (1), 139-158.  (Cited 210 times, according to Google Scholar.)

References

Australian writers
Academic staff of Macquarie University
Living people
Year of birth missing (living people)
Hebrew University of Jerusalem alumni